Kirkwood is an unincorporated community in Tehama County, California. It lies at an elevation of 220 feet (67 m).

References

Unincorporated communities in California
Unincorporated communities in Tehama County, California